Lacharissa is a genus of moths in the family Gelechiidae. It contains the species Lacharissa tanyzancla, which is found in South Africa.

The wingspan is about 38 mm. The forewings are light greyish-ochreous with some scattered dark fuscous scales. The stigmata are small and blackish, with the discal widely remote, the plical directly beneath the first discal. The hindwings are light grey.

References

Endemic moths of South Africa
Gelechiinae